Umesh Patwal is an Indian cricketer and cricket coach. He is head coach of the Everest Premier League team Pokhara Rhinos. He is former coach of Nepalese cricket team and former batting coach of  Afghanistan cricket team. He has been working as coach and consultant from couple of years. He was also the assistant coach of Indian Premier League (IPL) team Kochi Tuskers Kerala in year 2011. In 2018 Patwal was technical director of Nepalese Franchise league Pokhara Premier League.

References

Living people
Year of birth missing (living people)
Place of birth missing (living people)
Coaches of the Afghanistan national cricket team
Coaches of the Nepal national cricket team
Kochi Tuskers Kerala
Pokhara Premier League
Indian cricket coaches